Megara railway station is a station in the city of Megara, West Attica, Greece. It is located east of Megara, near the A8 motorway between Athens and Patras. It was opened on 27 September 2005 as part of the extension of the Athens Airport–Patras railway to Corinth and its current form dates to 2007. It has two side platforms and a siding. It should not be confused with the now-closed station on the old Piraeus–Patras railway, which is located within the city itself.

History
The station was opened on 27 September 2005 as part of the extension of the Athens Airport–Patras railway to Corinth, as part of Line 2 of the Athens Suburban Railway began serving the station. The station further updated its current form dates to 2007. It should not be confused with the now-closed station on the old Piraeus–Patras railway SPAP, located within the city. In 2008, all Athens Suburban Railway services were transferred from OSE to TrainOSE. In 2009, with the Greek debt crisis unfolding OSE's Management was forced to reduce services across the network. Timetables were cutback and routes closed, as the government-run entity attempted to reduce overheads. In 2017 OSE's passenger transport sector was privatised as TrainOSE, currently a wholly-owned subsidiary of Ferrovie dello Stato Italiane infrastructure, including stations, remained under the control of OSE. In July 2022, the station began being served by Hellenic Train, the rebranded TranOSE.

Facilities
The ground level station is assessed via stairs or a ramp. It has one Island platform & one Side platform, with station buildings located on platform 3 (the eastbound platform), with access to the platform level via stairs or lifts from a subway; a siding can also be found just east of the station platform 3. The Station buildings are equipped with a staffed booking office, toilets & automatic ticket barriers located at the entrance to the station. At platform level, there are sheltered seating, an air-conditioned indoor passenger shelter and Dot-matrix display departure and arrival screens and timetable poster boards on both platforms. Currently (2019), there is a local bus connecting the station, a large car park and taxi rank, all located at the station forecourt.

Services

Since 15 May 2022, the following weekday services call at this station:

Station layout

See also
Hellenic Railways Organization
TrainOSE
Proastiakos

References

Megara
Railway stations in Attica
Railway stations opened in 2005
Transport in West Attica